is a Quasi-National Park in Hyōgo Prefecture, Tottori Prefecture, and Okayama Prefecture, Japan.

Overview

Hyōnosen-Ushiroyama-Nagisan Kokutei Kōen comprises three areas of the Chūgoku Mountains, a mountain range which forms the backbone of the Chūgoku region of western Japan and extends under the Pacific Ocean.

Jurisdictions

Hyōgo Prefecture
Toyooka
Yabu
Shisō
Kami
Shin'onsen
Sayō
Okayama Prefecture
Mimasaka
Nishiawakura
Tottori Prefecture
City of Tottori
Iwami
Yazu
Wakasa
Chizu
Misasa

Mountains

Important mountains of the park include:

Mount Hyōno -- . Hyōgo and Tottori prefectures
Mount Sobu -- . Hyōgo Prefecture
Mount Mimuro -- . Hyōgo and Tottori prefectures
Mount Ushiro -- . Hyōgo and Okayama prefectures
Mount Nagi -- . Tottori and Okayama prefectures

See also
List of national parks of Japan

External links
氷ノ山後山那岐山国定公園, J-IBIS 
The Hyonosen - Ushiroyama Nagisan Quasi National Park, World Database on Protected Areas.

References

National parks of Japan
Protected areas established in 1969
Parks and gardens in Hyōgo Prefecture
Parks and gardens in Tottori Prefecture
Parks and gardens in Okayama Prefecture